The 1933 San Jose State Spartans football team represented State Teachers College at San Jose during the 1933 college football season.

San Jose State competed in the Far Western Conference (FWC). The team was led by head coach Dudley DeGroot, in his second year, and they played home games at Spartan Stadium in San Jose, California. Spartan Stadium, which is still home to San Jose State as of 2017, opened for the first time in 1933. The team finished the season with a record of four wins and four losses (4–4, 3–1 FWC). The Spartans outscored their opponents 102–78 for the season.

Schedule

Notes

References

San Jose State
San Jose State Spartans football seasons
San Jose State Spartans football